Kenneth Antone Bahnsen (born February 19, 1930) is a former American football fullback who played for the San Francisco 49ers.  He played college football at the University of North Texas from 1950-52. There he set net school career rushing and scoring records while in the Eagles' backfield.  After his pro career ended he became a longtime North Texas assistant football coach.

He also coached the Eagles' tennis team to consecutive Missouri Valley Conference championships in 1966 and 1967.

Bahnsen was inducted into the North Texas Athletic Hall of Fame in 1991. 

Bahnsen attended Vinton High School in Vinton, Louisiana.  

The Ken Bahnsen Gym was named after him in a dedication ceremony in 2005.

References

1930 births
Living people
American football fullbacks
North Texas Mean Green football players
San Francisco 49ers players
Players of American football from Louisiana
People from Vinton, Louisiana